Sounds of the Season: The Enya Collection is the fourth EP from the Irish singer, songwriter, and musician Enya, released on 28 November 2006 exclusively in the United States in Target stores by Rhino Custom Products and NBC Universal. The EP is a collection of six Christmas songs, four of which were included in the Special Christmas Edition of Enya's sixth studio album, Amarantine (2005). It was renamed Christmas Secrets EP for its four-track Canadian release by Warner Bros. and Warner Music Canada.

Background 
In 2006, Enya was approached by the Target Corporation to record an extended play of Christmas songs that would be exclusively released in its stores across the United States. Enya accepted, and produced the EP in partnership with NBC. It was first announced on the official Enya message board on 10 October 2006. To promote it, Enya performed "The Magic of the Night" and "It's in the Rain" for the Christmas in Rockefeller television show on 29 November 2006.

Track listing 
All music by Enya; all lyrics by Roma Ryan; all tracks produced by Nicky Ryan (Except tracks 2, 4 and 5 are composed by Enya and Roma Ryan and tracks 1, 3, and 6 are traditional, arr. Enya and Nicky Ryan).

Sounds of the Season: The Enya Collection 
 "Adeste Fidelis (O Come All Ye Faithful)"
 "The Magic of The Night"
 "We Wish You a Merry Christmas"
 "Christmas Secrets"
 "Amid the Falling Snow"
 "Oíche Chiúin (Silent Night)"

Christmas Secrets EP 
 "Adeste Fidelis (O Come All Ye Faithful)"
 "The Magic of the Night"
 "We Wish You a Merry Christmas"
 "Christmas Secrets"

Personnel 
 Enya – music, arranger

Production
 Nicky Ryan – arranger, engineer, mixing, producer
 Roma Ryan – composer, lyrics
 Daniel Polley – digital technician
 Dick Beetham – mastering
 Simon Fowler – photography
 Shelli Hill – executive producer for NBC Universal
 Sue Peterson – executive producer for Target Corporation
 Mithra Emami – executive producer for Warner Music Group

References

External links
 Enya's website
 Enya.com Discography

Enya compilation albums
2006 EPs
2006 Christmas albums
Christmas albums by Irish artists
Celtic Christmas albums
New-age Christmas albums